Bonifacio H. Gillego (June 5, 1921 – August 1, 2002) was a Philippine politician, military officer, and author.  He served in the Philippine House of Representatives for three terms (1987–1998), representing the 2nd Legislative District of Sorsogon.  "Boni" was one of the Framers of the 1987 Constitution. He had also served as a delegate to the Constitutional Convention in 1970.

For his resistance against the Marcos dictatorship, which led to a 14-year exile from the country, Gillego is one of the heroes honored by having his name etched at the wall of remembrance at the Philippines' Bantayog ng mga Bayani, which honors the martyrs and heroes who fought the authoritarian regime of Ferdinand Marcos.

Background 
Gillego earned his degrees in English and Philosophy at the Far Eastern University in Manila in 1950.  He earned a master's degree from the Johns Hopkins University School of Advanced International Studies as an Armed Forces of the Philippines Scholar. His eldest sister, Celerina Gotladera, served as the Chairman of Civil Service Commission and Mayor of Bulan, Sorsogon. He is a cousin of Gregorio Honasan.

Military career 
As a soldier, Gillego served in the Korean War and served in Operation Brotherhood in Laos.

Marcos Era: Exile and Resistance 
Gillego was exiled in the United States for 14 years during Martial Law.  He was one of the leaders of the opposition to Marcos in the United States and was a member of the Movement for a Free Philippines (MFP) during his exile. Gillego was often interviewed by American Press and Western media to expose Marcos' fraud, particularly with his military medal decorations. Through his writings and countless interviews with the American press, Gillego publicly questioned Marcos' war record. In 1986, he served on the Commission on Good Government on behalf of President Corazon Aquino to find real estate holdings of the Marcoses in New York.

Congress 
As a Congressman, "Boni" was known for his spartan lifestyle and stance against government corruption. One of his great accomplishments in Congress was agrarian reform legislation passed in June 1988.

Books and articles 
 Requiem for Reformism: The Ideas of Rizal on Reform and Revolution (1990)
 "The Other Version of FM's War Exploits".  We Forum (November 1982)
 "Marcos: The Hero of Kiangan Who Never Was".  Philippine News (September 1982) 
 "Our Police Forces as a Tool of American Imperialism".  Ronin (October 1972)

References 

1921 births
2002 deaths
Members of the House of Representatives of the Philippines from Sorsogon
Filipino military personnel of the Korean War
Far Eastern University alumni
Paul H. Nitze School of Advanced International Studies alumni
Corazon Aquino administration personnel
Individuals honored at the Bantayog ng mga Bayani
Military personnel honored at the Bantayog ng mga Bayani